Helen Nicoll (10 October 1937 – 30 September 2012) was an English author of children's books. She is best known for the Meg and Mog series. In total, she wrote 17 books. She worked with Jan Pienkowski (illustrator) for more than forty years on her books. In 1983, she founded an audiobook company called Cover to Cover. It was bought by BBC Worldwide in 2000.

Biography
She was educated at Blackwell and then Badminton School in Bristol. For a year she studied the violin at Dartington Hall in Devon.

Personal life
Helen married Robert Kime, an interior designer and antique dealer, in 1970. They had a daughter and a son.

References

External links

Jan Pienkowski, "Helen Nicoll obituary", The Guardian, 9 October 2012.
Penguin

1937 births
2012 deaths
20th-century British women writers
British children's writers
British women children's writers
British women novelists
People from Natland